Western Australia is the largest state of Australia, with an area of , and its fourth most populous, with a population of 2,660,026 as of the 2021 Australian census. Official population statistics are created by the Australian Bureau of Statistics, who have a census every five years. The most recent census for which data has been released is the 2021 census.

Urban centres by population 
Urban centres are defined by the Australian Bureau of Statistics to be clusters with a population of 1,000 or higher of urban SA1's. SA1's are areas that subdivide all of Australia, and have a population between 200 and 800 people and an average population size of 400.

Local government areas by population
Western Australia is divided into local government areas, who maintain roads, provide waste collection services, parks, libraries among other things. They are classified as either Cities, Towns of Shires, depending on population.

Regions by population 

Western Australia is made up of nine regions, as well as the Perth Metropolitan Region.

See also

 Greater Perth
 List of cities in Australia by population
 List of places in New South Wales by population
 List of places in the Northern Territory by population
 List of places in Queensland by population
 List of places in South Australia by population
 List of places in Tasmania by population
 List of places in Victoria by population
 Local government areas of Western Australia

References 

Western Australia
Places by population